Brandon Pottinger (born 8 June 2004) is a Jamaican track and field athlete. He won the gold medal at the 2022 IAAF World Junior Championships in the high jump.

Personal life
Pottinger attends Palmer Trinity Catholic High in Florida. Pottinger qualifies to compete for Jamaica through parental links - his father Marlon Pottinger was a former Kingston College athlete.

Career
The Jamaican U20 high jump champion, he won the high jump at the 2022 IAAF World Junior Championships with a new personal best jump of 2.14m in Cali, Colombia. This put him ahead of the South African Brian Raats in silver and Bulgarian bronze medalist Bozhidar Saraboyukov. It was Jamaica’s first ever high jump gold medal at an international championship.

References

External links

2004 births
Living people
Jamaican male high jumpers
21st-century Jamaican people
World Athletics U20 Championships winners